Cow cod soup is a traditional, rustic dish in Jamaican cuisine that is considered an aphrodisiac and made with bull penis (or "cod"). It is traditionally cooked with bananas and Scotch bonnet peppers in a white rum-based broth. Cow cod is a rural delicacy.

See also
 List of Jamaican dishes
 List of soups
Run down
Mannish water

References

External links
Write up about the soup

Jamaican soups
Offal
Bulls